Targettville is a community in Weldford Parish, located on the Richibucto River, 7.55 km NE of Fords Mills, on the road to Browns Yard. Today the community has a popular outdoor skating rink and recreation center with an outdoor playground. The facility holds community events such as music nights and family re-unions as well as having a very active program for young children during the summer.

History

This community had a Post Office 1928-1956 and was site of the Targettville Quarry, an operation to extract stone along the river and move them to Richibucto to construct the break water for that harbour.

Notable people

See also
List of communities in New Brunswick

References

Settlements in New Brunswick
Communities in Kent County, New Brunswick